La Vie Magnifique De Charlie is a 2017 American comedy-drama film directed by Bobby Huntley and co-produced by director himself with Nikki Wade. The film stars Kortnee Price, Lailaa Brookings, and Nikki Lashae with Ashley S. Evans, Kai N. Ture, Priah Ferguson, Nicole Douglas, and Mary Ann la Cue in supporting roles. The film has been shot in Atlanta, Georgia. The film premiered on 1 June 2017 in the United States. The film received positive reviews from critics. In 2018 at the Black Reel Awards, the film was nominated for the Outstanding Original Song.

Cast
 Kortnee Price as Charlie
 Lailaa Brookings as Kayla
 Nikki Lashae as Keturah Aka Pandakitty
 Ashley S. Evans as Brandy
 Kai N. Ture as Young Charlie
 Priah Ferguson as Young Brandy
 Nicole Douglas as Brenda
 Mary Ann la Cue as Nana Liza
 Jeffery Chalk Jr. as Julio
 Cecil M. Henry as The Pastor (Chuckie's Father)
 Jacobi Hollingshed as Young Chuckie
 Connie Lane as Aunt Zannalee
 Mary Meyer as Cynthia
 Jennifer Nash as Aunt Dorothy
 Laura Poindexter as Vivian 
 Bennett Rodgers as Parker
 Andrea Ryan as Psychiatrist
 Latoya Torre as Sharon

References

External links 
 

American comedy-drama films
2017 films
2017 comedy-drama films
2010s English-language films
2010s American films
English-language comedy-drama films